Picking Up & Dropping Off  is a television film starring Scott Wolf and Amanda Detmer. It premiered on ABC Family in 2003 on their 25 Days of Christmas programming block.

Premise
A divorced father and a divorced mother start to meet at Denver International Airport when picking up and sending off their children to ex-spouses for holidays.

Cast
Scott Wolf as Will
Amanda Detmer as Jane
Eddie McClintock as Charlie
Rachelle Lefèvre as Georgia
Maggie Hill as Claire

External links
 

2003 television films
2003 films
Canadian Christmas films
ABC Family original films
English-language Canadian films
Christmas television films
2000s Christmas films
Canadian television films
Films directed by Steven Robman
2000s Canadian films